David Steele (May 7, 1974 – March 25, 2017) was an American professional racing driver who won numerous sprint car racing championships and also competed in IndyCar and NASCAR races. Steele last drove a winged sprint car in the Southern Sprintcar Shootout Series, where he won the first 5 races in series history. Steele was killed in a crash at Desoto Speedway on March 25, 2017.

He was posthumously inducted into the National Sprint Car Hall of Fame on the first eligible ballot in 2018.

Racing career

Sprint Cars, Midgets, and Silver Crown

Championships
Steele won three Tampa Bay Area Racing Association (TBARA) championships.

He claimed 60 wins in USAC sprint car (26), midget (18), and Silver Crown (16) races between 1996 and 2007.

He claimed the USAC Silver Crown Series championship in 2004 and 2005, putting him in the company of drivers such as Mario Andretti, A. J. Foyt, Al Unser, Jeff Gordon, and Tony Stewart.

Race Wins
He won the 2001 and 2003 Turkey Night Grand Prix midget car race. Other notable Turkey Night winners include A. J. Foyt, Tony Stewart, and Billy Boat.

He was also a two-time winner of the Little 500, held annually at Anderson Speedway. Throughout his sixteen starts in that race, he was a five-time pole-sitter and finished in the top 5 ten times.

Steele won the Copper Classic at Phoenix International Raceway eight times. He won the Silver Crown portion 5 times and Midget race 3 times. In 1998, he won the Night Before the 500 race.

IndyCar and NASCAR
Steele attempted to make his Indy Racing League IndyCar Series debut in 1996 at the Las Vegas Motor Speedway for ABF Motorsports but failed to qualify. He made his first start in 1998 at Phoenix International Raceway, the second race of the season, driving for RSM Marko, then drove in the final two races of the year for Panther Racing. He failed to finish all three races. He was entered in a Panther car for the 1999 Indianapolis 500 but crashed in practice.

Steele drove in the first two races of the 2000 NASCAR Busch Series for Felix Sabates. After finishes of 23rd and 34th he failed to qualify for the next three races and Steele and the team parted ways.

Steele also competed in four ARCA Racing Series races in 1999 and 2000 and two Infiniti Pro Series races (one each in 2002 and 2003). In 2002, Steele raced for Bowes Seal Fast Racing at Michigan finishing eighth in the Infiniti Pro Series.

Death 

Steele was killed in a racing accident during a Southern Sprintcar Shootout Series race at Desoto Speedway in Bradenton, Florida, on March 25, 2017. His car's front wheel struck and overrode the rear wheel of another car during the event, sending him into the wall; he was pronounced dead at the scene.

Honors
  The Carb Night Classic at Lucas Oil Raceway, starting in 2018, is now known as the Dave Steele Classic.
  He was elected to the National Sprint Car Hall of Fame on the first ballot in 2018 under the six month rule.
  He was elected to the United States Auto Club Hall of Fame in 2019.

Motorsports career results

American open–wheel racing results
(key) (Races in bold indicate pole position)

Indy Racing League

Indianapolis 500

NASCAR
(key) (Bold – Pole position awarded by qualifying time. Italics – Pole position earned by points standings or practice time. * – Most laps led.)

Busch Series

ARCA Bondo/Mar-Hyde Series
(key) (Bold – Pole position awarded by qualifying time. Italics – Pole position earned by points standings or practice time. * – Most laps led.)

References

External links
 

1974 births
2017 deaths
American Speed Association drivers
ARCA Menards Series drivers
IndyCar Series drivers
Indy Lights drivers
NASCAR drivers
USAC Silver Crown Series drivers
Racing drivers from Tampa, Florida
Sports deaths in Florida
Racing drivers who died while racing
RSM Marko drivers
Panther Racing drivers